State Route 281 (SR 281) is a  east-west state highway in Cannon County, Tennessee that links the communities of Iconium, Bluewing, and Center Hill.

Route description

SR 281 begins at an intersection with SR 53 just a few miles south of Woodbury. It winds its way east as Iconium Road to pass through farmland along the edge of the Highland Rim to pass through Iconium, where it becomes Manustown Road. The highway continues its way northeast to pass through Bluewing, where it has an intersection with US 70S/SR 1 and becomes Center Hill Road. SR 281 the curves to the east through more farmland to enter Center Hill, where it comes to an end at an intersection with SR 146. The entire route of SR 281 is a rural two-lane highway.

Major intersections

References

281
Transportation in Cannon County, Tennessee